Elections to Down District Council were held on 19 May 1993 on the same day as the other Northern Irish local government elections. The election used four district electoral areas to elect a total of 23 councillors.

Election results

Note: "Votes" are the first preference votes.

Districts summary

|- class="unsortable" align="centre"
!rowspan=2 align="left"|Ward
! % 
!Cllrs
! % 
!Cllrs
! %
!Cllrs
! %
!Cllrs
!rowspan=2|TotalCllrs
|- class="unsortable" align="center"
!colspan=2 bgcolor="" | SDLP
!colspan=2 bgcolor="" | UUP
!colspan=2 bgcolor="" | DUP
!colspan=2 bgcolor="white"| Others
|-
|align="left"|Ballynahinch
|bgcolor="#99FF66"|49.4
|bgcolor="#99FF66"|2
|30.8
|2
|19.8
|1
|0.0
|0
|5
|-
|align="left"|Downpatrick
|bgcolor="#99FF66"|65.3
|bgcolor="#99FF66"|6
|13.4
|1
|0.0
|0
|21.3
|0
|7
|-
|align="left"|Newcastle
|bgcolor="#99FF66"|56.4
|bgcolor="#99FF66"|4
|20.9
|1
|6.7
|1
|16.0
|0
|6
|-
|align="left"|Rowallane
|29.0
|1
|bgcolor="40BFF5"|54.4
|bgcolor="40BFF5"|3
|16.6
|1
|0.0
|0
|5
|- class="unsortable" class="sortbottom" style="background:#C9C9C9"
|align="left"| Total
|51.2
|13
|28.5
|7
|9.9
|3
|10.4
|0
|23
|-
|}

Districts results

Ballynahinch

1989: 2 x SDLP, 2 x UUP, 1 x DUP
1993: 2 x SDLP, 2 x UUP, 1 x DUP
1989-1993 Change: No change

Downpatrick

1989: 5 x SDLP, 1 x UUP, 1 x Alliance
1993: 6 x SDLP, 1 x UUP
1989-1993 Change: SDLP gain from Alliance

Newcastle

1989: 4 x SDLP, 2 x UUP
1993: 4 x SDLP, 1 x UUP, 1 x DUP
1989-1993 Change: DUP gain from UUP

Rowallane

1989: 3 x UUP, 1 x DUP, 1 x SDLP
1993: 3 x UUP, 1 x DUP, 1 x SDLP
1989-1993 Change: No change

References

Down District Council elections
Down